Hugh Graham Mackay (born 1867; date of death unknown) was a Scottish football goalkeeper who played for Rotherham Town and Burslem Port Vale in the 1890s.

Career
Mackay played for Vale of Midlothian, Heart of Midlothian, Middlesbrough, and Rotherham Town, before joining Burslem Port Vale in October 1893. He kept a clean sheet on his debut in a 1–0 win over Notts County at the Athletic Ground on 25 November. Although a goalkeeper, he played at outside-right in a 2–1 home victory over Woolwich Arsenal on 6 January. He played 16 Second Division games in the 1893–94 season, but was released in May 1894. He later played for Wigan County.

Career statistics
Source:

References

1867 births
Year of death missing
Footballers from Edinburgh
Scottish footballers
Association football goalkeepers
Vale of Midlothian F.C. players
Heart of Midlothian F.C. players
Middlesbrough F.C. players
Rotherham Town F.C. (1878) players
Port Vale F.C. players
Wigan County F.C. players
English Football League players